The Royal Commonwealth Pool is a category-A-listed building in St Leonard's, Edinburgh, Scotland that houses one of Scotland's main swimming pools. It is usually referred to simply as the Commonwealth Pool and known colloquially as the 'Commie'.

History

The pool was commissioned by the Council under a plan by the then Lord Provost, Sir Herbert Archbold Brechin in 1966 as part of a wider project to bring the Commonwealth Games to Edinburgh. This, with the help of other committee members such as Sir John Inch, came to fruition in October 1969.

Construction began in 1967 and was completed in October 1969. The architecture was by Robert Matthew Johnson Marshall with structural input from Ove Arup & Partners.

The pool was used for elite diving events hosted in Edinburgh, also being used for the 2014 Commonwealth Games and the inaugural 2018 European Championships, both hosted in Glasgow.

The pool was closed 2009 to 2012 for major internal remodelling.

Architectural award nominations

In 1993 it was selected by the international conservation organisation DoCoMoMo as one of sixty key Scottish monuments of the post-war period. It was also nominated in 2002 by the Architecture Heritage Society of Scotland as one of the most significant modern contributions to Scottish heritage. These sentiments were echoed in Prospect 100 best modern Scottish buildings, published in 2005.
S&P Architects were the architects and lead consultants for the 2012 refurbishment and were awarded the Scottish Design Award in 2012 for the best reuse of a listed building.

Refurbishment
In June 2009, the pool was closed to the public to begin refurbishment. The project, led by Frank and Charlie of S&P Architects (now Space&Place Architects) began in August 2009, costing approximately £37 million, and included new  diving and teaching pools as well as improvements to the changing rooms, café, reception, and the dive gym. It was originally expected to be finished by mid-2011 but did not reopen until March 2012.

See also

DoCoMoMo Key Scottish Monuments
List of Commonwealth Games venues
List of post-war Category A listed buildings in Scotland
Prospect 100 best modern Scottish buildings

References

External links

Edinburgh Leisure
S&P Architects

Sports venues completed in 1970
1970 establishments in Scotland
Category A listed buildings in Edinburgh
Listed sports venues in Scotland
Sports venues in Edinburgh
Swimming venues in Scotland
1970 British Commonwealth Games venues
1986 Commonwealth Games venues
2014 Commonwealth Games venues
Commonwealth Games swimming venues
2018 European Aquatics Championships